Garm may refer to:

Geography
 Garm (crater), a crater on Mars
 Garm (glacier), a glacier in East Greenland
 Garm, South Khorasan, a village in South Khorasan Province, Iran
 Gharm, Tajikistan, a town in the Rasht Valley
 Gharm Oblast, a defunct administrative division of Soviet Union

Fiction
 Garm (Norse mythology), a large dog or wolf in Norse mythology that guards Hel, the land of the dead
 Garm (talking dog), a talking dog from J.R.R. Tolkien's short story "Farmer Giles of Ham"
 Garm Bel Iblis, a character from Star Wars Legends
 The Garm, a dog-like alien being in the Doctor Who episode "Terminus"
 Garm, a character from Vinland Saga
 Garm the Wizard, the main antagonist of the Gauntlet Dark Legacy video game
 GARM, a fictional Swiss glacier research center in Deus Ex: Mankind Divided

Other uses
 Garm (magazine), a Swedish-language satirical magazine published in Finland, 1923–1953
 HNoMS Garm
 Kristoffer Rygg (born 1976), Norwegian musician

See also
 Galm, a character in the Shining series of video games
 Galm, a squadron in the Ace Combat Zero: The Belkan War